The Solicitor General of Hong Kong is head of the Legal Policy Division of the Department of Justice in Hong Kong. He (to date no woman has held the post) is responsible for the development of legal policy, advising the Secretary for Justice (called the Attorney General before 1997) on legal issues, and overseeing the department's staff and legislative programme.

History

The position of Solicitor General in Hong Kong was created after the end of World War II. The Solicitor General acted as the deputy of the Attorney General and regularly appeared in court.

In 1979, the roles of Law Draftsman, Law Officer (Civil) and Crown Prosecutor (called from the inception of the position Director of Public Prosecutions) were created and the position of Solicitor General was abolished. It was reinstated in 1981 with the Solicitor General being put in charge of legal policy.

The Secretary for Justice is now assisted by five law officers, namely:

 the Solicitor General who heads the Legal Policy Division,
 the Director of Public Prosecutions (formerly Crown Prosecutor) who head the Prosecutions Division,
 the Law Officer (Civil Law) (formerly Crown Solicitor) who heads the Civil Law Division,
 the Law Officer (International Law) who heads the International Law Division, and
 the Law Draftsman who heads the Law Drafting Division

Current holder

The position of Solicitor General is currently vacant. Mr. MUI Kei Fat, Llewellyn is currently acting as Solicitor General. The  previous incumbent, Mr Wesley Wong SC transferred to become Secretary of the Law Reform Commission some time in 2021.

Remuneration for the post, as advertised in 2015, is HK$201,950 (up from HK$162,650 in 2000) per month, together with housing allowance, 'leave passage allowance', and other benefits.

List of Solicitors General before 1997

List of Solicitors General After 1997 

The incumbent Solicitor General is an unofficial Justice of the Peace, and is given the "JP" designation while in office; this designation is removed upon leaving office, unless officially appointed separately.

See also
Solicitor General
Attorney General
Justice minister

References

Lists of political office-holders in Hong Kong
Prosecution
Legal professions
Justice ministers
Hong Kong